The Sweden national cricket team is the team that represents Sweden in international cricket. It is organised by the Swedish Cricket Federation which has been an affiliate member of the International Cricket Council (ICC) since 1997 and an associate member since 2017. The team coach is former South African international Jonty Rhodes, who was appointed in September 2020.

Sweden made its international debut in 1993, at the European Nations Cup, and has since played regularly in the lower divisions of European Cricket Council tournaments and in other series against European teams. Sweden first hosted an ICC-approved international cricket tournament in August 2016, when the 2016 ICC Europe Division Two was played in Stockholm.

In April 2018, the ICC decided to grant full Twenty20 International (T20I) status to all its members. Therefore, all Twenty20 matches played between Sweden and other ICC members after 1 January 2019 will be a full T20I.

History

The first cricket club in Sweden was formed in Gothenburg in 1883; one of the founders, Erik Blidbert, had learnt the game in London, and became a natural leader for Sweden's pioneering Cricket enthusiasts. The club's full name was Lyckans Samfund (Society of Joy), a pun on the name of the local neighbourhood.

The first organised club of modern times called the Stockholm Cricket Club, was created in 1948 by the staff of British Embassy in Stockholm. They played against the crews of passing ships and made annual visits to Helsinki. Västerås started in the 1960s and teams from Gothenburg and Mariestad (founded by Ugandan-Indians) followed in the 1970s.

The Swedish Cricket Federation (SCF) was formed in 1990. The driving force behind it was Guttsta Wicked Cricket Club. The Swedish Cricket Federation became a Member of the ICC in 1991. Over the years, clubs like Stockholms Akademiska Cricketsällskap set-up by students at Stockholm University in 1996, which is now one of the largest club in the country, fuelled the growth of Cricket in Sweden. Initial years, the progress was slow but the interest was there. Foreign teams also toured Sweden from time to time to keep things interesting. MCC visited Sweden in June 1999 which was one of the high points for the Cricket in the country.

After becoming an affiliate member of ICC, Sweden participated in many ICC-organised tournaments. In 1997 Sweden successfully hosted its first ever ICC Europe (then ECF) tournament, an indoor tournament in Halmstad.

In 2011 Sweden participated and won the European Division 3 in Slovenia. The following year Sweden became runners-up in European Division 2 championship in Corfu, Greece which earned the national team a place in the European Division 1, the highest-level tournament Sweden ever played in.

The national club scene inspired by the achievements of the national team started taking cricket seriously and in 2012 the SCF increased its membership to 21 clubs. The newly formed Division 2 was set up the same year. In 2013, six new clubs joined the league with total numbers of players in the country then standing at around 1500. With the ICC development fund, youth cricket also got much attention with youth camps organised in the three larger cricketing regions: Stockholm, Malmö and Göteborg. All of this meant further strengthening of the club scene adding to the membership of SCF. In 2014 the SCF applied to become members of the Swedish Sports Confederation (Riksidrottsförbundet, RF). The RF accepted the application and recognized SCF as its 71st member organisation in May 2015.

2016 was the first year the government funding was available to SCF. This helped build many new cricket facilities in the country that also made it possible to host ICC Europe WCL Division 2 tournament in Stockholm. Sweden finished runners-up in that tournament and once again gained promotion to European division 1. In 2015–16 Sweden was one of the largest receivers of refugees in Europe; many of these refugees came from cricket-playing countries. This helped form many new clubs and helped existing clubs gain new members because of government's integration initiatives. Cricket is growing at a rapid pace in Sweden and clubs exist in almost every part of the country.

In 2021, Sweden was among five teams excluded from the ICC T20I Championship for failing to play enough fixtures in the relevant period, an effect of the COVID-19 pandemic.

Sweden will make their T20I debut during the tour to Denmark in August 2021.

Squad
 Abhijit Venkatesh (c)
 Umar Nawaz (vc)
 Khalid Ahmad
 Baz Aybui
 Zaker Taqawi
 Azam Khalil
 Hameed Suleri
 Wynand Boshoff
 Liam Karlsson
 Syed Waqas Haider
 Ismaeel Zia
 Ankit Dubey
 Lemar Momand
 Imal Zuwak

Tournament History
2011 ICC European T20 Championship Division Three: 1st − Promoted
2011 ICC European T20 Championship Division Two: 11th – Remained
2012 ICC European T20 Championship Division Two: 2nd – Promoted
2013 ICC European T20 Championship Division One: 11th − Relegated
2016 ICC Europe Division Two: 2nd − Promoted
2017 ICC World Cricket League Europe Region Division One: 2nd −Remained

Records
International Match Summary — Sweden
 
Last updated 19 July 2022

Twenty20 International 
 Highest team total: 146/4 (17.1 overs) v. Finland on 22 August 2021 at Kerava National Cricket Ground, Kerava.
 Highest individual score: 75*, Dipanjan Dey v. Finland on 22 August 2021 at Kerava National Cricket Ground, Kerava.  
 Best individual bowling figures: 4/23, Hassan Mehmood v. Denmark on 14 August 2021 at Svanholm Park, Brøndby.

T20I record versus other nations

Records complete to T20I #1677. Last updated 19 July 2022.

See also 
 List of Sweden Twenty20 International cricketers
 Sweden women's national cricket team

References

External links
 

Cricket in Sweden
National cricket teams
Cricket
Sweden in international cricket